Pennsylvania is an album by the American band Pere Ubu, released in 1998. The album marked Tom Herman's return to Pere Ubu's studio work after a twenty-year absence. It is a loose concept album about geography, travel, and road trips.

Guitarist Wayne Kramer joined the band's tour in support of the album.

Critical reception
The Hartford Courant thought that "in many ways, the band is more focused than ever on its new Pennsylvania, churning up compelling guitar tracks while Thomas sings or often speaks over the top of tracks: weary, wary, compelling in his observations." The Chicago Tribune determined that "though a little less hook-oriented than its predecessor, Pennsylvania finds the band cloaking David Thomas' delirious visions of America in a claustrophobic yet compelling cubist blues-rock that could have emanated from no other band in the world."

Stereo Review opined that "the acoustic/slide-guitar mix in 'SAD.TXT' is downright Zeppelinesque, and in 'Woolie Bullie' ... Ubu locks into a monolithic, pounding riff that may be the dumbest thing these folks have ever played, and it sounds great." 

Reviewing a 2021 remix of the album, Record Collector wrote that Herman's "presence is dynamic from the chugging chords of opener 'Woolie Bullie' (most definitely not the old rock’n’roll song) through 'Muddy Waters' (certainly not blues) creating high-energy fragments of nearly-pop."

Director's Cut
In 2005, to celebrate Pere Ubu's 30th Anniversary, a "Director's Cut" was released which featured new mastering, alternate mixes, and two bonus tracks.

Track listing
All tracks composed by Pere Ubu

Original release
"Woolie Bullie" – 3:41
"Highwaterville" – 1:36
"SAD.TXT" – 3:26
"Urban Lifestyle" – 2:55
"Silent Spring" – 4:15
"Mr Wheeler" – 4:14
"Muddy Waters" – 3:49
"Slow" – 1:07
"Drive" – 4:42
"Indiangiver" – 0:58
"Monday Morning" – 3:32
"Perfume" – 4:31
"Fly's Eye" – 2:39
"The Duke's Saharan Ambitions" – 4:56
"Wheelhouse" – 23:25 
song's actual length is 5:03; contains three hidden tracks: an untitled, nearly inaudible voice loop (6:04–7:04), "Fly's Eye" (remix) (starts at 8:02) and "My Name Is..." (starts at 10:48)

"Director's Cut"
"Woolie Bullie" * – 3:41
"Highwaterville" – 1:36
"SAD.TXT" – 3:26
"Urban Lifestyle" * – 2:55
"Silent Spring"  – 4:15
"Mr Wheeler" * – 3:35
"Muddy Waters" * – 3:26
"Slow" – 1:07
"Drive" * – 4:17
"Indiangiver" – 0:58
"Monday Morning" * – 3:32
"Perfume" – 4:31
"Fly's Eye" – 2:39
"The Duke's Saharan Ambitions" – 4:56
"Wheelhouse" – 5:03 
"Fly's Eye" (remix) – 2:44
"SAD.TXT" (live) – 3:48
"My Name Is..." (live) – 7:30
"Dr Sax" (out-take) – 5:12
(*) alternate mix

Personnel
Pere Ubu
David Thomas – vocals, organ ("Woolie Bullie"), virtual voices ("My Name Is...")
Tom Herman – guitar, bass, tack piano, snare percussion
Jim Jones – guitar, bass, organ
Robert Wheeler – EML & digital synthesizers, theremin, organ
Michele Temple – bass, guitar, organ, piano
Steve Mehlman – drums, percussion
Technical
Paul Hamann - engineer
John Thompson - design

References

Pere Ubu albums
1998 albums